The 2019–20 season is Rangers's 40th season in the top-tier division in Hong Kong football. Rangers will compete in the Premier League, Senior Challenge Shield, FA Cup and Sapling Cup this season. However, due to the 2020 coronavirus pandemic in Hong Kong, Rangers announced their withdrawal from the remaining matches this season in April 2020.

Squad

First Team
As of 7 March 2020

 LP

 FP

 FP

 (on loan from Pegasus)
 FP

 (on loan from Eastern)

 FP
 FP
 (on loan from R&F)

 (on loan from Yuen Long)

Remarks:
LP These players are registered as local players in Hong Kong domestic football competitions.
FP These players are registered as foreign players.

Transfers

Transfers in

Transfers out

Loans In

Loans Out

Team staff

Competitions

Hong Kong Premier League

Table

Hong Kong Senior Challenge Shield

Hong Kong Sapling Cup

Group stage

Hong Kong FA Cup

Remarks

References

Hong Kong football clubs 2019–20 season